Bamburgh is a village and civil parish on the coast of Northumberland, England. It had a population of 454 in 2001, decreasing to 414 at the 2011 census.

The village is notable for the nearby Bamburgh Castle, a castle which was the seat of the former Kings of Northumbria, and for its association with the Victorian era heroine Grace Darling, who is buried there.

The extensive beach by the village was awarded the Blue Flag rural beach award in 2005. The Bamburgh Dunes, a Site of Special Scientific Interest, stand behind the beach. Bamburgh is popular with holidaymakers and is within the Northumberland Coast Area of Outstanding Natural Beauty.

History
The site now occupied by Bamburgh Castle was previously home to a fort of the Celtic Britons known as Din Guarie and may have been the capital of the kingdom of Bernicia, the realm of the Gododdin people, from the realm's foundation in c. 420 until 547, the year of the first written reference to the castle. In that year, the citadel was captured by the Anglo-Saxon ruler Ida of Bernicia (Beornice) and became Ida's seat. The Anglo-Saxons called the place Bebbanburh, meaning "Queen Bebba's stronghold"; this was later corrupted into the modern "Bamburgh". Aidan of Lindisfarne came to this area from the monastery of Iona in 635 on behalf of King Oswald of Northumbria.

Following the defeat of Northumbrian forces by the Viking Great Heathen Army, at York in 867, the united Kingdom of Northumbria disintegrated. The limited evidence available suggests that north-east Northumbria – centred on the future County Durham, Northumberland and Lothian – remained an independent Anglo-Saxon kingdom, with Bamburgh its de facto capital. (During the late 9th and early 10th centuries, southern Northumbria was controlled by Vikings in the form of the Danelaw, while north-west Northumbria became part of the late British kingdom of Strathclyde.)

The late medieval village began to develop near the castle. During the Dissolution of the Monasteries the property of the friars, including the castle, were seized on behalf of Henry VIII.

Late medieval British author Thomas Malory identified Bamburgh Castle with Joyous Gard, the mythical castle home of Sir Lancelot in Arthurian legend.

St Aidan's Church

According to Bede, St Aidan built a wooden church outside the castle wall in AD 635, and he died here in AD 652. A wooden beam preserved inside the church is traditionally said to be the one on which he rested as he died. The present church dates from the late 12th century, though some pre-conquest stonework survives in the north aisle. The chancel, said to be the second-longest in the country (60 ft; 18m), was added in 1230; it contains an 1895 reredos in Caen stone by W.S. Hicks, depicting northern saints of the 7th and 8th centuries. There is a effigy of local heroine Grace Darling in the North Aisle. This formed part of the original Monument to Grace Darling but was removed due to weathering of the stonework. Her memorial is sited in the churchyard in such a position that passing ships can see it.

The property has been Grade I listed since December 1969. The listing summary includes this description:"Parish church. C12, C13 and C14. Restored 1830 and later C19. Squared stone and ashlar; chancel and north transept have stone slate roofs; other roofs not visible. West tower, nave, aisles, transepts and chancel".

Note that after the Dissolution of the Monasteries in the mid 1500s, the monks were forced to leave and St Aidan's became the parish church for the village. Over the subsequent centuries major repairs and restorations have been completed. 
The church's crypt holds the remains of 110 individuals who died in the 7th and 8th centuries; they had initially been buried in the castle's Bowl Hole graveyard. The remains were found during a project between 1998 and 2007. Finally, in 2016, they were moved into the crypt. Since November 2019, the crypt can be viewed by visitors through a small gate.

Governance
An electoral ward of the same name exists. This ward includes Belford and also stretches south to Ellingham with a total population taken at the 2011 census of 4,846.

In popular culture 

Bamburgh Castle, under its Saxon name Bebbanburg, is the home of Uhtred, the main character in Bernard Cornwell's  The Saxon Stories 

In the Netflix series of Cornwell's books, The Last Kingdom, Bamburgh is the hereditary seat of protagonist Uhtred Ragnarson, a Saxon heir apparent usurped by his uncle Ælfric. The series follows Uhtred's attempts to re-establish his rightful status as ealderman of Bamburgh.

Bamburgh is also featured in the open-world video game series Forza Horizon 4 released in October 2018.

Additionally, Bamburgh is featured in the Realtime Strategy video game Ancestors Legacy released in 2018.

Notable people
Æthelfrith of Northumbria
William George Armstrong
Joe Baker-Cresswell
Ida of Bernicia
Prideaux John Selby
Grace Darling
Uhtred the Bold

Photo gallery

Bamburgh Lighthouse

See also

Bamburgh Coast and Hills, a Site of Special Scientific Interest along the coast north-east of Bamburgh
List of lighthouses in England

References

External links 

 Bamburgh Photos
 Local History and Information on Bamburgh, The Farne Islands and surrounding areas.
 Stained glass windows at St. Aidan's Church, Photos by Peter Loud
 Bamburgh Tourist Attractions
 Bamburgh Online
 GENUKI (Accessed: 5 November 2008) 	
 Northumberland Communities (Accessed: 5 November 2008) 
 Trinity House

 
Villages in Northumberland
Capitals of former nations
Populated coastal places in Northumberland
Civil parishes in Northumberland